Scott Plous is an American academic social psychologist. He is currently a Professor of Psychology at Wesleyan University and Executive Director of Social Psychology Network.

Early Life and Education 
Scott Plous was born in Milwaukee, Wisconsin. He attended college at the University of Minnesota in Minneapolis, and earned his PhD in social psychology at Stanford University, where he also completed a MacArthur Foundation postdoctoral fellowship in international Peace and Cooperation. His doctoral advisor at Stanford was Philip Zimbardo.

Career

After his postdoctoral fellowship, Plous spent two years as a visiting professor in psychology and arms control at the University of Illinois at Urbana–Champaign. He then joined the psychology faculty at Wesleyan University, where he has been a professor since 1990.

His areas of research include the psychology of prejudice and discrimination, judgment and decision making, international security and counter-terrorism, interactive web-based research, and the human use of animals and the environment. He is also the founder of Social Psychology Network.

Plous coined the term “action teaching” in 2000.  In this article, he presented action teaching as the pedagogical counterpart to action research, a term coined by Kurt Lewin in the aftermath of World War II (Marrow, 1969). This use of action teaching, he says, “can lead not only to a better understanding of psychology but to a more just, compassionate and peaceful world.”  

In 2001, he published a study that evaluated the reliability of Institutional Animal Care and Use Committees (IACUCs), and found that animal testing standards in the United States are widely inconsistent across different research institutions.

After his father almost died of cancer, Plous developed a character he called Joe Chemo, intending to present a more realistic view of smoking than the Joe Camel character used by R. J. Reynolds. The first image ran in the 1996 winter issue of Adbusters magazine.

Plous has published two books, and numerous journal articles, on social issues, animal rights, and psychology. He is best known as the founder of Social Psychology Network, a suite of nonprofit web sites supported by the National Science Foundation, created in 1996. Currently, Plous also teaches social psychology online through Coursera's MOOC.

Publications

Books
Plous, S. (1993). The psychology of judgment and decision making. New York: McGraw-Hill.  [Translated into Chinese, Korean, Norwegian, and Russian; hardbound edition concurrently published by Temple University Press.]
Plous, S. (Ed.). (2003). Understanding prejudice and discrimination. New York: McGraw-Hill.

Journal articles
Plous, S. (2000). "Responding to overt displays of prejudice: A role-playing exercise". Teaching of Psychology, 27, 198-200.
Plous, S. (2000). "Tips on creating and maintaining an educational web site". Teaching of Psychology, 27, 63-70.
Plous, S. (1998). "Signs of change within the animal rights movement: Results from a follow-up survey of activists". Journal of Comparative Psychology, 112, 48-54.
Plous, S. (1996). "Attitudes toward the use of animals in psychological research and education: Results from a national survey of psychologists". American Psychologist, 51, 1167-1180.
Plous, S. (1996). "Attitudes toward the use of animals in psychological research and education: Results from a national survey of psychology majors". Psychological Science, 7, 352-358.
Plous, S. (1996). "Ten myths about affirmative action". Journal of Social Issues, 52, 25-31.
Plous, S., & Herzog, H. A., Jr. (2001). "Reliability of protocol reviews for animal research". Science, 293, 608-609.
Plous, S., & Herzog, H. A., Jr. (1999, June). "Should AWA coverage be broadened? Results from a survey of animal care and use committees". Lab Animal, pp. 38–40.
Plous, S., & Neptune, D. (1997). "Racial and gender biases in magazine advertising: A content-analytic study". Psychology of Women Quarterly, 21, 627-644.
Plous, S., & Williams, T. (1995). "Racial stereotypes from the days of American slavery: A continuing legacy". Journal of Applied Social Psychology, 25, 795-817.

Honors and Awards
Professor Plous is a Fellow of the Association for Psychological Science, the American Psychological Association, the Society for the Teaching of Psychology, the Society of Experimental Social Psychology, and the American Association for the Advancement of Science. His work has been recognized with several honors and awards, including those listed below:

Research and Writing:

 Gordon Allport Intergroup Relations Prize
 Otto Klineberg Intercultural and International Relations Award
 William James Book Award (for The Psychology of Judgment and Decision Making)

Teaching and Mentoring:
Charles L. Brewer Distinguished Teaching of Psychology Award (American Psychological Foundation)
Connecticut Professor of the Year (Carnegie Foundation and Council for Advancement and Support of Education)
Award for Outstanding Undergraduate Teaching and Mentoring (SPSSI)
Binswanger Prize for Excellence in Teaching (Wesleyan University, 1998 and 2011)
Professional Service:

 Award for Service to the Field (Society for Personality and Social Psychology)
 Award for Distinguished Service to the Society (Society for Personality and Social Psychology)
 Society for General Psychology Presidential Citation (for founding Social Psychology Network)

Notes

External links
 Plous.socialpsychology.org

American social psychologists
American animal rights scholars
Animal testing in the United States
Living people
Wesleyan University faculty
Year of birth missing (living people)